Giuseppe Marullo (died 1685, Naples) was an Italian painter of the Baroque period, active near his natal city of Orta di Atella. He was a pupil of Massimo Stanzione.  He painted Saint Peter Released by the Angel (1630–40) which is now at the Museo del Prado in Madrid.

References

External links

17th-century Italian painters
Italian male painters
Italian Baroque painters
1685 deaths
Year of birth unknown
Painters from Naples